= Murder of Alice Mallett =

1922 murder in Michigan

On June 9, 1922, in Jackson, Michigan, a circus worker, George W. Straub, plotted and executed the murder of social settlement worker Alice Mallett (1882–1922), using an axe. The public outrage over the murder, caused concern for Straub's own life as the public attempted to capture him with plans to execute him.

== Background ==
The town of Jackson, Michigan, with the boost of the automotive industry had been economically advancing. With a population of 48,000 at the time, this made the town a destination for travelers, as Jackson is equidistant from Detroit, Lansing, and Kalamazoo.

On June 9, 1922, Alice Mallett, Matron to the Florence Crittenden Home, was found deceased in a field, with severe lacerations to the neck and blunt trauma to the head.

== Investigation and backlash ==
By June 10, an investigation had picked and detained 23 potential assailants, with two other officers pursuing a travelling circus that had been in town the day of the murder. The investigation concluded shortly thereafter as George W. Straub confessed to the assault only ten days later, June 19.

Straub allegedly, after exiting the circus, waited for Mallett, whilst wielding an axe, which he would then use to commit the murder. His intentions are unknown; Mallett and Straub had an altercation, in which Straub was provoked to strike Mallett in the head with an axe, before nearly beheading her in an empty field.

Straub's confession sparked public outcry, as a mob of several thousand Jackson citizens gathered around the local jail that Straub was confined in, demanding his lynching; authorities managed to disperse the crowd with tear gas. The local outrage prompted authorities to relocated Straub to Lansing for his own safety. Yet the relocation was ineffective as numerous Jackson citizens, made an effort to "seize" Straub, believing he was kept at the Ingham County Jail in Mason.

On June 20, George Straub was relocated Jackson for his arraignment, Straub pleaded guilty on counts of second degree murder, and faced a life sentence, with solitary confinement, and manual labor, in Marquette Branch Prison, Michigan.

Straub's axe was later by seized authorities at a Polish family's house, two blocks away from where Mallett was found.
